Reunion in France is a 1942 American war film distributed by Metro-Goldwyn-Mayer starring Joan Crawford, John Wayne, and Philip Dorn in a story about a woman in occupied France who, learning her well-heeled lover has German connections, aids a downed American flyer.  Ava Gardner appears in a small uncredited role as a Parisian shopgirl. The movie was directed by Jules Dassin.

Plot
It is 1940 in Paris. Michele de la Becque (Joan Crawford) is a career woman in love with industrial designer Robert Cortot (Philip Dorn). They enjoy a luxurious lifestyle unfazed by the approach of World War II. The two become engaged.

After the Battle of France and subsequent German occupation, Michele discovers her fiancé is socializing with Nazi officers, including General Schroeder, the military commandant of Paris; and the SS Gruppenfuehrer in charge of the Gestapo in the Greater Paris region. Cortot's factories are manufacturing heavy duty trucks and weapons for the Germans. She confronts him, and he does not deny her evidence. She is outraged by his collaboration. People in the streets curse them, wish them ill, and spit at them, promising there will be a reckoning one day.

She aids a downed American in the Eagle Squadron of the Royal Air Force, pilot Pat Talbot (John Wayne) from Pennsylvania. She finds herself falling in love with him. Michele makes contact with the Resistance and with their aid, arranges for the escape of Talbot. The Germans are becoming suspicious of both her and Cortot, but do not impede Cortot's obtaining travel papers to Lisbon, "toward the freedom of the Americas ... the great embarkation point." Under the cover of a weekend trip to Fontainebleau, with Talbot disguised as her chauffeur, Michele brings him to a field in the country where a Lockheed Hudson patrol bomber will take him and two members of the British Special Operations Executive back to England. Along the way, she learns that Cortot is a major leader, perhaps the leader, of the French Resistance. As the Hudson approaches the field, Pat urges Michele to get on the airplane and escape to England with them.

Back in Paris, General Schroeder and the Gruppenfuehrer have become suspicious of Cortot. Too many of his trucks are suffering transmission failures after running a couple of thousand miles. The Gruppenfuehrer accuses him of sabotage; he replies that his responsibility ends after the design is approved - and acidly comments he cannot be held responsible for the failures when the Germans are providing him with substandard materials and locking up his engineers in concentration camps. The SS officer them questions him about Michele's activities, pointing out she had never arrived at Fontainebleau, and requires Cortot to accompany him to Gestapo headquarters for further questioning. 

As Cortot, General Schroeder, and the Gruppenfuehrer are leaving Cortot's house, Michele walks through the front door, apparently delighted to see them all. When asked, she explains she felt lonely because her fiancé Robert was not with her, turned around, and returned to Paris to be with him. This explanation satisfied the general, and he orders the Gruppenfuehrer to release Cortot's butler, being held in the Gruppenfuehrer's car as an accomplice. The Germans drive away, Schroeder feeling vindicated that his friend is loyal to Germany, the SS officer disgusted because he has been made to look foolish. Cortot, Michele, and the butler wave goodbye as the Boche leave.

As they stand in the doorway, some children across the street spit in their direction and curse them. Cortot comments that one day, they will understand resistance to the enemy takes many forms. A British airplane is flying over the city, and Robert comments that the Germans do not even shoot at it any more, that they think it is harmless; but in fact if the Germans knew the French, they would see it is deadly dangerous to them. Robert and Michele watch as the airplane, flying at the altitude of the con level, uses his contrail to write the word "COURAGE" in the sky over Paris for all to see.

Cast
 Joan Crawford as Michele de la Becque
 John Wayne as Pat Talbot
 Philip Dorn as Robert Cortot
 Reginald Owen as Gestapo agent
 John Carradine as Head of the Paris Gestapo
 Moroni Olsen as Gerbeau
 Natalie Schafer as Amy Schröder
 Albert Bassermann as General Hugo Schroeder
 Ann Ayars as Juliette
 J. Edward Bromberg as Durand
 Henry Daniell as Emile Fleuron
 Howard Da Silva as Anton Stregel (as Howard da Silva)
 Charles Arnt as Honoré
 Morris Ankrum as Martin
 Edith Evanson as Genevieve
 Ernst Deutsch as Captain (as Ernest Dorian)
 Ava Gardner as shopgirl Marie (uncredited)

Reception
The movie made $1,046,000 in the U.S. and Canada and $817,000 in other markets, earning MGM a profit of $222,000.

Film Daily noted "The film, directed capably by Jules Dassin, has been given a first-rate production by Joseph L. Mankiewicz."

T.S. in The New York Times observed: "If Reunion in France is the best tribute that Hollywood can muster to the French underground forces of liberation, then let us try another time. [The film is] simply a stale melodramatic exercise for a very popular star. In the role of a spoiled rich woman who finds her 'soul' in the defeat of France, Joan Crawford is adequate to the story provided her, but that is hardly adequate to the theme."

Years after making the movie, Joan Crawford was quoted as saying: "Oh God. If there is an afterlife and I am to be punished for my sins, this is one of the pictures they'll make me see over and over again. John Wayne and I both went down for the count, not just because of a silly script but because we were so mismatched. Get John out of the saddle, and you've got trouble."

See also
 John Wayne filmography

References

External links 

 
 
 
 

1942 films
American aviation films
Metro-Goldwyn-Mayer films
Films about the French Resistance
American black-and-white films
1942 romantic drama films
Films scored by Franz Waxman
Films directed by Jules Dassin
Films about shot-down aviators
American romantic drama films
Films produced by Joseph L. Mankiewicz
World War II films made in wartime
1940s English-language films